The Wall of Discovery is an environmental artwork that includes a 253-foot-long printed "blackboard" located in the center of the Scholars Walk on the University of Minnesota campus. This installation was designed to celebrate the discoveries, inventions and creations of alumni and faculty of the University that have brought significant changes to the world in which we live.

The method used to capture the work was first to create an extensive list of notable U of M graduates in as many fields as possible. Extensive research was done by Minneapolis design firm LA ink that led to the finding of many original hand written notes and diagrams chronicling the discoveries by these scholars. The documents were then scanned and retouched, pixel by pixel, until they looked as if they were rendered in chalk on a chalkboard. 20 Glass edge lit panels were also designed to both illuminate the walkway and possibly inspire current students toward future discoveries.

An installation of this nature has never before been attempted by a major institution like the University of Minnesota.

The Artwork was submitted to the SEGD design competition in 2007 and won their "Honor Award" the highest achievement category. That same year it also received the AIA Minnesota Honor Award.

Persons represented on the wall
Over 100 alumni and faculty from the University of Minnesota are represented on the wall a few of whom are:
Robert W. Gore
Seymour Cray
Ancel Keys
Norman Borlaug
John Berryman
Earl Bakken
Reynold Johnson
F. John Lewis (cardiac surgeon)
Hubert Humphrey
Roy Wilkins
Herb Brooks
Garrison Keillor
Deke Slayton
Warren Burger
Harry Blackmun
James ‘Crash’ Ryan 2
Saul Bellow
Bob Dylan
Raymond Lindeman

References

SEGD 2007 award page
AIA MN Award Page
Wall of discovery page at LA ink's website
U of M || University News Service || News Release
University of Minnesota Alumni Association : Wall of Discovery
News Releases: UMNnews: U of M
U of M || University News Service || U of M Moment
 Reising, Jenny S. "In Their Own Words." segdDESIGN No. 17 2007: 44-47
Mueller, Heather L. "University to unveil a new wall featuring discoveries, achievements." Minnesota Daily 29 Sept. 2006: A1
Gerhz, Jim. "A U alumnus and his work." Minneapolis Star Tribune 8 Dec. 2006: A1
Tsong-Taatarii, Richard. "Wall of Discovery celebrates U's best." Minneapolis Star Tribune 29 Sept. 2006: A1
"Honoring Great Thinkers." Minnesota Nov.-Dec. 2006. 42-43

Public art in the United States
Installation art works
Inventions